Eastern Cemetery is an historic cemetery in East Bayside neighborhood of Portland, Maine, USA.

Eastern Cemetery may also refer to:
Geelong Eastern Cemetery, Victoria, Australia
Eastern Cemetery (Louisville), Kentucky, United States
Eastern Cemetery (Madrid), Spain
Eastern Cemetery (Uddevalla), Sweden
Eastern Cemetery, Kingston upon Hull, UK
Eastern Methodist Cemetery, also known as Old Ebenezer Cemetery or Ebenezer Cemetery, in the Barney Circle neighborhood of Washington, D.C., USA